The 2023 American sports drama film Creed III, the third in the Creed series and the overall ninth installment in the Rocky franchise, was accompanied by two soundtrack albums. Creed III: The Soundtrack, featuring original songs executive produced by Dreamville, and Creed III: Original Motion Picture Soundtrack, featuring an original score composed by Joseph Shirley, were both released on March 3, 2023.

The original soundtrack includes contributions from Dreamville artists, J. Cole, Bas, Cozz, Omen, Lute, Ari Lennox, JID, and EarthGang.

Background
In October 2022, it was announced that composer Joseph Shirley would score Creed III. Shirley was previously part of Ludwig Göransson's team scoring the first two films in the series, as a technical score engineer and score programmer. He was also the composer of television series' The Book of Boba Fett, Fairfax, Bad Trip, and The Mysterious Benedict Society. Shirley spoke on the composition saying:

On November 20, 2022, director and actor Michael B. Jordan announced at ComplexCon that J. Cole and Dreamville will be executive producing the original soundtrack.

Release
On February 3, 2023, Dreamville released the first single "Ma Boy" with JID and Lute. On February 22, the second single "Blood, Sweat & Tears" was released with Bas and Black Sherif featuring Kel-P.

Track listing

Sample credits
 "Adonis Interlude (The Montage)" contains a sample of "The Watcher" as performed by Dr. Dre.

Charts

Score album

Creed III: Original Motion Picture Soundtrack is the soundtrack album for the 2023 film Creed III, composed by Joseph Shirley. It was released on March 3, 2023, through Sony Classical Records.

Track listing

References

2023 soundtrack albums
2020s film soundtrack albums
Dreamville Records albums
Interscope Records soundtracks
Rocky (film series) soundtracks
Sony Classical Records soundtracks
J. Cole